, also known by the nickname , is a Japanese professional golfer.

Amateur career
On 20 May 2007, Ishikawa became the youngest winner ever of a men's regular tournament on the Japan Golf Tour by winning the Munsingwear Open KSB Cup at the age 15 years and 8 months. He competed as an amateur and it was Ishikawa's first tour appearance. He finished one shot ahead of Japan's 9th top ranked player at the time, Katsumasa Miyamoto. The highest ranked player on the Official World Golf Ranking who took part in the event was Toru Taniguchi who finished T13, 6 shots shy of Ishikawa. Taniguchi ranked number 86 in the world after the event.

Professional career
Ishikawa turned professional in 2008 and won another Japan Golf Tour tournament, the mynavi ABC Championship. By the close of 2008 he had become the youngest ever player to reach the top 100 of the Official World Golf Rankings.

Ishikawa played in PGA Tour tournaments for the first time in 2009. He was cut from the Northern Trust Open, the Arnold Palmer Invitational and the 2009 Masters Tournament. He finished 71st at the Transitions Championship.

On 28 June 2009, Ishikawa won the Gateway to the Open Mizuno Open Yomiuri Classic on the Japan Golf Tour to qualify for the 2009 Open Championship, the first major event he qualified for without receiving a special exemption.

With four wins on the Japan Golf Tour in 2009, in September, Ishikawa became the youngest golfer ever to reach the top 50 of the Official World Golf Rankings.

Ishikawa dominated the Japan Golf Tour for much of the 2009 season and has been the top-ranked Japanese player in the World Rankings. On 18 October, he tied for second at the Japan Open, losing to Ryuichi Oda on the second hole of a playoff. He finished the season as the money list leader on the Japan Golf Tour with ¥183.52 million.

At the Japan GTO awards, held in December 2009, Ishikawa earned 9 titles. In addition to top money earner, he was named MVP, best scoring average (69.93), best putting average (1.724), highest birdie haul (4.42), etc.

On 2 May 2010, in the final round of The Crowns, he shot a 12-under-par 58 to win the tournament by five strokes. The 58 was the lowest score ever carded in a Japan Golf Tour event, eclipsing a 59 achieved in the first round of 2003 Acom International by Masahiro Kuramoto, and lowest ever on any major golf tour. His round consisted of 12 birdies and six pars. However, because the course was a par-70 (versus the par-72 courses where some players shot 59), the record is not the lowest in relation to par.

Ishikawa caught the attention of American golf fans at the 2010 U.S. Open. Wearing a bright bubblegum pink outfit, he played under par on the first day and was tied for second after the second day before falling back over the weekend.

On 30 March 2011 Ishikawa announced that he will be donating all of his 2011 tour earnings, plus an additional ¥100,000 for every birdie he makes during the year, to the Japan earthquake relief efforts.

On 11 March 2012, the one-year anniversary of the Japan earthquake, Ishikawa finished runner-up to George McNeill in the Puerto Rico Open, his highest PGA Tour finish thus far. Just over a week later, Ishikawa became a member of the PGA Tour. The second-place finish earned Special Temporary Membership by exceeding $411,943, or 150th on the PGA Tour's 2011 money list.

Ishikawa played on the PGA Tour in 2013. He made 13 cuts in 23 events, finishing 149th on the money list and missing the FedEx Cup playoffs (ranked 141st). He played the Web.com Tour Finals and finished 13th to retain his PGA Tour card for 2014.

Ishikawa got nine top-25s and made 14 cuts during the 2014 season, including a second-place finish at the Shriners Hospitals for Children Open and a T-5 at the unofficial ISPS Handa World Cup of Golf.

Professional wins (19)

Japan Golf Tour wins (18)

Japan Golf Tour playoff record (5–4)

Other wins (1)
2008 Kansai Open

Results in major championships
Results not in chronological order in 2020.

CUT = missed the half-way cut
"T" = tied
NT = No tournament due to COVID-19 pandemic

Summary

Most consecutive cuts made – 3 (2012 PGA – 2013 PGA)
Longest streak of top-10s – 0

Results in The Players Championship

"T" indicates a tie for a place

Results in World Golf Championships
Results not in chronological order before 2015.

1Cancelled due to COVID-19 pandemic

QF, R16, R32, R64 = Round in which player lost in match play
NT = no tournament
"T" = tied

Team appearances
Professional
Royal Trophy (representing Asia): 2009 (winners), 2010, 2011, 2012 (winners), 2013
Presidents Cup (International team): 2009, 2011
World Cup (representing Japan): 2013, 2016

See also
2013 Web.com Tour Finals graduates
List of golfers with most Japan Golf Tour wins
Lowest rounds of golf

References

External links

Panasonic Ryo Ishikawa official site
Type of golf equipment used by Ryo Ishikawa

Japanese male golfers
Japan Golf Tour golfers
PGA Tour golfers
Korn Ferry Tour graduates
Sportspeople from Saitama Prefecture
1991 births
Living people